Lamelliconcha circinata, common name the "purple venus clam", is a species of bivalve mollusc in the family Veneridae, the venus clams. This species can be found around the coasts of the islands in the West Indies.

References

 Coan, E. V.; Valentich-Scott, P. (2012). Bivalve seashells of tropical West America. Marine bivalve mollusks from Baja California to northern Peru. 2 vols, 1258 pp

External links
 Born, I. Von. (1778). Index rerum naturalium Musei Cæsarei Vindobonensis. Pars I.ma. Testacea. Verzeichniß der natürlichen Seltenheiten des k. k. Naturalien Cabinets zu Wien. Erster Theil. Schalthiere.
 Gmelin J.F. (1791). Vermes. In: Gmelin J.F. (Ed.) Caroli a Linnaei Systema Naturae per Regna Tria Naturae, Ed. 13. Tome 1(6). G.E. Beer, Lipsiae
 Lamarck [J.-B. M. de. (1818). Histoire naturelle des animaux sans vertèbres. Tome 5. Paris: Deterville/Verdière, 612 pp]

Bivalves described in 1778